Nevrina verlainei is a moth in the family Crambidae. It was described by Jean Ghesquière in 1942. It is found in the Democratic Republic of the Congo.

References

Moths described in 1942
Pyraustinae